Upper Boat power station supplied electricity to the town of Pontypridd and the wider area from 1904 to 1972. The power station was developed in several stages firstly in 1902, then from 1924 to 1942. It was owned and operated by the South Wales Electrical Power Distribution Company until the nationalisation of the electricity supply industry in 1948. The station was decommissioned in 1972 and was demolished in 1976.

History
Upper Boat power station was built by the South Wales Electrical Power Distribution Company from 1902. The company was established by Parliament through the South Wales Electrical Power Distribution Company Act 1900 (63 & 64 Vict. c. cclxxxii). The legal authority to undertake redevelopment was given by Local Acts of Parliament: the South Wales Electrical Power Distribution Company Act 1920 (10 & 11 Geo. 5 c. vi) and the South Wales Electrical Power Distribution Company Act 1922 (12 & 13 Geo. 5 c. lxvii).  The Company also owned and operated Llynfi power station and generating stations at Abercarn, Caerphilly, Cowbridge, Llantwit Fardre, Panteg, and St. Mellons.

The power station at Upper Boat (51°34'34"N 3°18'07"W) was adjacent to the Great Western railway and the generating station had sidings for the delivery of coal. The site was also adjacent to the River Taff which provided water for cooling. 

The foundation stone was laid on 30 April 1902. Electricity was first generated in 1904.

Equipment specification
The new (1924-42) plant at Upper Boat power station was installed in several phases:

 18 MW (low pressure) in 1924,
 20 MW (low pressure) in 1925,
 25 MW (low pressure) in 1929,
 3 × 30 MW (high pressure) in 1939, 1940 and 1942

The plant comprised:

 Boilers:
 8 × Babcock and Wilcox 60,000 lb/h (7.56 kg/s) stoker fired boilers operating at 350 psi and 650/750°F (24.1 bar and 343/399 °C),
 4 × Babcock and Wilcox 182,000 lb/h (22.93 kg/s) pulverised fuel boilers operating at 650 psi and 850°F (44.8 bar and 454°C),
 1 × Babcock and Wilcox 364,000 lb/h (45.86 kg/s) pulverised fuel boiler operating at 650 psi and 850°F (44.8 bar and 454°C),
 1 × Mitchelll 182,000 lb/h (22.93 kg/s) chain grate/ pulverised fuel boiler operating at 650 psi and 850°F (44.8 bar and 454°C),

The total evaporative capacity of the boilers was 1,754,000 lb/h (221 kg/s).

 Coaling equipment:
 Pulverising mills, 'Lopulco' 13.5 tons/h on 2 boilers, 27 tons/h on 1 boiler, Babcock & Wilcox ‘E’ type 10.8 tons/h on 2 boilers, 'Atritor' 5.4 tons/h on 1 boiler.

 Generating sets:
 1 × 18 MW Parsons, Mirrlees-Watson condenser,
 1 × 25 MW Parsons,
 1 × 20 MW English Electric, Hick-Hargreaves condenser,
 3 × 30 MW English Electric, 1 generating at 11 kV, 2 at 33 kV, the first machine was the two-cylinder impulse-reaction type, with double-flow exhaust, 3,000 rpm.
 2 × 1 MW Allen-GEC auxiliary sets, 400 V.

The total installed generating capacity was 155 MW, and the output capacity was 144 MW.

Condensing water was taken from River Taff at 6.42 million gallons per hour (8.11 m3/s); there was 1 Film reinforced concrete cooling tower with a capacity of 2.25 million gallons per hour (2.84 m3/s).

There was a 132 kV substation south east of the power station that provided the electricity connection to the national grid. Later a 275 kV substation was built south of the power station.

Operations
By 1923 the station had a generating capacity of 14 MW, and sold 49 GWh of electricity.

Soon after the commissioning of the new plant at Upper Boat power station the Electricity (Supply) Act 1926 (16-17 Geo. 5 c. 51) was enacted. This established the Central Electricity Board (CEB) with a duty to identify high efficiency ‘selected’ power stations that would supply electricity most effectively; Upper Boat was designated a selected station. The CEB also constructed the national grid (1927–33) to connect power stations within a region.

From about 1937 steam from the station was used to provide process and space heating to the nearby Treforest trading estate.

The British electricity supply industry was nationalised in 1948 under the provisions of the Electricity Act 1947 (10-11 Geo. 6 c. 54). The South Wales Electrical Power Distribution Company was abolished, ownership of Upper Boat power station was vested in the British Electricity Authority, and subsequently the Central Electricity Authority and the Central Electricity Generating Board (CEGB). At the same time the electricity distribution and sales responsibilities of the South Wales Electrical Power Distribution Company were transferred to the South Wales Electricity Board (SWALEB).

Operating data
Operating data for the period 1946–72 is shown in the table:

The less intensive use of the ‘low pressure’ plant between 1954 and 1958 is evident.

Closure and aftermath
Upper Boat power station was decommissioned in 1972. The buildings subsequently demolished in 1976 and the area has been redeveloped with industrial and commercial units. The 132 kV and 275 kV substations are extant (2020).

See also
 Timeline of the UK electricity supply industry
 List of power stations in Wales

References

Demolished power stations in the United Kingdom
Former power stations in Wales